Korea National University of Education (Acronym: KNUE; Korean: , Hanguk Kyowon Daehakgyo, colloquially Kyowondae) is a South Korean national university which specializes in pre- and in-service teacher training and educational research. It comprises four colleges and three graduate schools. The student body consists of about 2,400 undergraduate and 3,300 graduate students. The university is widely regarded as the top South Korean university in the field of education.

Characteristics

It was founded in 1984 based on the Article 43 of the Higher Education Act and the Presidential Decree on the Establishment of Korea National University of Education. As the most prestigious national institution for teacher training and educational research, it is the only university in South Korea that collectively prepares kindergarten, primary school, and secondary school teachers. It also provides continuous teacher education and conducts comprehensive educational research.

Pre-service education
The university conducts pre-teacher training in its undergraduate course. It offers dual majors regardless of kindergarten, primary, or secondary education. Graduates receive a teaching certificate and a bachelor of education degree. Since its establishment, it has produced 16,000 graduates as of 2017, and most of them have been working as teachers in national, public and private schools, academic scholars, bureaucrats, and educational researchers.

In-service education
The university runs the Center for In-service Education which provides reeducation and professional training for current teachers. It is responsible for the national qualification training of kindergarten, elementary, middle and high school principals, and master teachers.

Educational research
It explores educational theories and problems in school education and develops new educational theories, materials and policies. The university also makes a feedback of research results from school educators.

Academics

Admissions
Admissions to the university is highly selective because the students are regarded as pre-service teachers. All applicants are required to get a letter of recommendation from each local educational superintendent and pass the entry interviews. Students are admitted by major instead of into a general freshman pool.

Scholarships
The university offers scholarships to all undergraduate students. They are exempted from admission fee and all tuition fees by presidential decree and can stay in the university dormitory for free for two years. These are fully covered through government funding.

Academic structure
Four colleges of the university offer 24 undergraduate degree programs. For master and doctoral programs there are three graduate schools with 50 programs from four fields of studies.

See also
List of national universities in South Korea
List of universities and colleges in South Korea
Education in Korea

References

External links
 University website

Educational institutions established in 1984
Universities and colleges in North Chungcheong Province
National universities of education in South Korea
1984 establishments in South Korea
Cheongju